FNCI may refer to:

 First Nations Composer Initiative
 Forces Nouvelles de Côte d'Ivoire